Rogue's Gallery is a 1968 mystery film produced by A.C. Lyles for Paramount Pictures that was directed by Leonard Horn and starring Roger Smith, Greta Baldwin and Dennis Morgan.

The film's sets were designed by the art directors Roland Anderson and Hal Pereira.

Plot
Private detective John Rogue becomes fascinated about the case of an attractive but suicidal young woman.

Cast
 Roger Smith as John Rogue 
 Greta Baldwin as Valerie York 
 Dennis Morgan as Dr. Jonas Pettingill 
 Edgar Bergen as Roy Benz 
 Brian Donlevy as Detective Lee 
 Farley Granger as Edmund Van Dermot 
 Mala Powers as Maggie 
 Richard Arlen as Man in Club 
 Jackie Coogan as Funeral Director 
 Johnnie Ray as Police Officer 
 William 'Billy' Benedict as Jocko 
 Robert Riordan as Oscar Ludman 
 Lee Delano as Swen 
 Bob Hoy as Collins 
 Craig Littler as Wheeler 
 Marcia Mae Jones as Mrs. Hassanover 
 James X. Mitchell as TV Reporter 
 Regis Parton as Patrol Officer 
 Patrick Hawley as Patrol Officer 
 Chuck Hicks as Assailant
 George DeNormand as Observe Outside Office 
 George Hoagland as Club Member 
 William Meader as Club Member 
 Leoda Richards as Mourner at Cemetery
 Hank Robinson as Police Officer

References

Bibliography
 Roberts, Jerry. Encyclopedia of Television Film Directors. Scarecrow Press, 2009.

External links
 

1968 films
1960s mystery films
American mystery films
Films directed by Leonard Horn
Paramount Pictures films
1960s English-language films
1960s American films